Dirdja Wihardja (born 10 August 1966) is an Indonesian weightlifter. He competed in the men's bantamweight event at the 1988 Summer Olympics.

References

External links
 

1966 births
Living people
Indonesian male weightlifters
Olympic weightlifters of Indonesia
Weightlifters at the 1988 Summer Olympics
Place of birth missing (living people)
Asian Games medalists in weightlifting
Weightlifters at the 1986 Asian Games
Asian Games bronze medalists for Indonesia
Medalists at the 1986 Asian Games
20th-century Indonesian people
21st-century Indonesian people